Ptolemy Alexander Reid (May 8, 1918 – September 2, 2003) was a Guyanese veterinarian and politician who served as Prime Minister of Guyana from 1980 to 1984.

Early life 
He was born in Dartmouth, British Guiana attending the village primary school where he eventually became a teacher before entering the Cyril Potter College of Education (known at the time as the Teachers' Training College). 

Reid studied veterinary medicine at the Tuskegee Institute in Alabama, then returned to Guyana in 1955, and married Ruth Chalmers. Unable to find employment in British Guiana, he moved to England where he became a member of the Royal College of Veterinary Surgeons, and then practiced in the Canadian province of Saskatchewan.  He returned to Guyana in 1958 and took on a position at Bookers Sugar Estate as the Chief Veterinary Officer, and became involved in politics in 1960 when he joined the People's National Congress.

Political career 
He ran for office in 1961, hoping to represent the constituency of Pomeroon-Supenaam, but was unsuccessful.

When Forbes Burnham took power in 1964, Reid became a member of Burnham's cabinet, where he served as Deputy Premier and minister of home affairs (1964-1966), finance minister (1967–1970); minister of agriculture (1970-1972); and minister of agriculture and national development (1972–1974). In 1980, when Burnham resigned as Prime Minister to become President, Reid took his place.

He retired in 1984, taking up farming in East Bank Demerara. His wife died in 1997, and he remarried Marjorie Griffith. She died in May 2003, and Reid himself followed on 2 September 2003, aged 91.

Recognition 

 Order of Excellence
 Order of Gran Cruz (Colombia)
 Distinguished Alumni Award from the Tuskegee University

Further reading 

 A Troublesome Man: About the Life of Dr. Ptolemy Reid, Prime Minister of Guyana (1980-1984) by Stella Bagot, Balboa Press 2018 (ISBN 9781982206840)

References

External links

The Ptolemy Reid Rehabilitation Centre for Children with Disabilities

1918 births
2003 deaths
People from Pomeroon-Supenaam
Prime Ministers of Guyana
Vice presidents of Guyana
Finance ministers of Guyana
Tuskegee University alumni
People's National Congress (Guyana) politicians
Afro-Guyanese people
20th-century Guyanese politicians